Julian Perry Robinson (11 November 1941 – 22 April 2020) was a British chemist and peace researcher.

Academic career
Born in Jerusalem, Perry Robinson was educated at Canford School, and went up to Merton College, Oxford in 1960 to read Chemistry; he took a second class degree in 1964. After university he spent four years studying national and international patent law with a London-based firm of Chartered Patent Agents.

He held research appointments at the Free University of Berlin, Harvard University and the University of Sussex.

He was a consultant to the World Health Organization, United Nations, the International Committee of the Red Cross and the United Nations Environment Programme.

He was a member of staff at the Stockholm International Peace Research Institute from 1968 to 1971. While there he was a principal contributor to the six volume study The Problem of Chemical and Biological Warfare.

He was also a co-convenor of the Pugwash Study Group on Implementation of the Chemical and Biological Weapons Conventions, co-directed the Harvard Sussex Program on Chemical and Biological Weapons, which published the CBW Conventions Bulletin.

Personal life and death
He died on 22 April 2020 as a result of complications related to COVID-19 during the COVID-19 pandemic in England. His widow is the academic Mary Kaldor.

See also
 List of peace activists

References

External links
 J P Perry Robinson  at Harvard Sussex Program
 Joint Centre for History and Economics

1941 births
2020 deaths
Academics of the University of Sussex
Alumni of Merton College, Oxford
British chemists
Deaths from the COVID-19 pandemic in England
Academic staff of the Free University of Berlin
Harvard University people
World Health Organization